Bledar Borova (born 27 October 1983) is an Albanian football coach. He is the current director of Apolonia's academy and the head coach of the club's under-19s side.

References

1983 births
Living people
People from Fier County
People from Fier
KF Apolonia Fier managers
Kategoria Superiore managers
Albanian football managers